Lukas Tulovic (born 15 June 2000) is a German Grand Prix motorcycle racer. In 2021 he competed in the Enel MotoE World Cup, aboard an Energica Ego Corsa.

Career
From 2015 to 2022 he competed in the FIM Moto2 European Championship.

On August 15th 2021, Tulovic won his first Grand Prix in the MotoGP MotoE World Cup at the Red Bull Ring in Spielberg, and on October 9th 2022, Tulovic became the first German rider to ever win the FIM Moto2 European Championship.

Tulovic is managed by O1NE Sport GmbH.

Moto2 World Championship (2018-present)

Liqui Moly Husqvarna Intact GP (from 2023) 
From 2023, he will race for Liqui Moly Husqvarna Intact GP.

Career statistics

FIM Moto2 European Championship

Races by year
(key) (Races in bold indicate pole position, races in italics indicate fastest lap)

Grand Prix motorcycle racing

By season

By class

Races by year
(key) (Races in bold indicate pole position; races in italics indicate fastest lap)

References

External links

 

2000 births
Living people
German motorcycle racers
Moto2 World Championship riders
German people of Serbian descent
MotoE World Cup riders
People from Eberbach (Baden)
Sportspeople from Karlsruhe (region)